Alamin Usman Alamin is the second Mufti of Eritrea. He was appointed in 1996 and is the incumbent mufti. In 1954 he graduated from Al-Azhar University in Egypt.

See also
 List of Muftis of Eritrea

References

Living people
Islam in Eritrea
Al-Azhar University alumni
Year of birth missing (living people)